Nebraska is the thirty-third richest state in the United States of America, with a per capita income of $19,613 (2000).  Nebraska's personal per capita income is $32,276 (2004).



Nebraska counties by per capita income

Note: Data are from the 2010 United States Census Data and the 2006-2010 American Community Survey 5-Year Estimates.

References

External links
Nebraska Department of Economic Development Databook

Nebraska
Economy of Nebraska
Income